Mikhail Valeryevich Pashnin (born 11 May 1989, in Chelyabinsk, Russia) is a Russian professional ice hockey defenceman who is currently playing for SKA Saint Petersburg in the Kontinental Hockey League (KHL). He was drafted in the 7th round of the 2009 NHL Entry Draft by the New York Rangers, as well as first-overall pick in that year's KHL Junior Draft by CSKA Moscow.

Playing career
Pashnin never signed a contract with the Rangers, opting to remain in Russia, signing a two-year contract extension with Lokomotiv Yaroslavl on 7 April 2015.

In the 2018–19 season, his fifth within CSKA Moscow, Pashnin as a regular on the blueline appeared in 42 regular season games for 5 points. He made 6 post-season appearances to help CSKA capture their first Gagarin Cup.

On  1 June 2019, Pashnin left CSKA as a free agent, signing a one-year contract with his third KHL club, Salavat Yulaev Ufa. In the 2019–20 season, Pashnin appeared in 54 regular season games from the blueline, finishing a point shy of previous career highs with 10. He registered 2 assists in Salavat's opening round defeat of Avangard Omsk before the remainder of the playoffs were cancelled due to the COVID-19 pandemic.

As a free agent from Salavat, Pashnin again moved to sign a two-year contract with Metallurg Magnitogorsk on 7 May 2020.

Upon completion of his contract with Magnitogorsk, Pashnin signed a two-year contract with his fifth KHL club, SKA Saint Petersburg, on 9 May 2022.

Career statistics

Regular season and playoffs

International

Awards and honors

See also
List of first overall KHL draft picks

References

External links

1989 births
Living people
HC CSKA Moscow players
Krasnaya Armiya (MHL) players
Lokomotiv Yaroslavl players
HC Mechel players
Metallurg Magnitogorsk players
New York Rangers draft picks
Russian ice hockey defencemen
Salavat Yulaev Ufa players
SKA Saint Petersburg players
Sportspeople from Chelyabinsk